Don't Get Too Close is the third studio album by American record producer Skrillex. It was released on February 18, 2023, through Owsla and Atlantic Records. It was released the day after his 2023 album Quest for Fire, with both records being announced and promoted simultaneously. It was preceded by the singles "Way Back" (with PinkPantheress and Trippie Redd), "Real Spring" (with Bladee), and "Don't Get Too Close" (with Bibi Bourelly). Skrillex is also separately credited as "Sonny Moore" on the title track, and is featured as a vocalist for the first time since 2015's Skrillex and Diplo Present Jack Ü.

Promotion and release
Skrillex teased the album on social media alongside Quest for Fire on January 1, 2023, with a message hinting at the names of the two albums, and their release later that year. A snippet of samples from both albums was uploaded, alongside an animation featuring the two "ill" logos that he uses for each album.

The title and album artwork were officially revealed on February 13, 2023, alongside the music video for the title track.

The album was surprise-released during Skrillex's performance at Madison Square Garden, alongside Fred Again and Four Tet, on February 18, 2023.

Critical reception

Reviewing the album for Pitchfork, Chal Ravens described it as "the more adventurous but marginally less successful" of Skrillex's second and third albums, and wrote that Skrillex "scores the interior world of our hero's adventure in a very-now merger of emo, rap, J-pop, memecore, video game music, and angsty boy-girl duets". Ravens also found the album to be "intriguingly weird" and "likely to confound the older fans while opening new doors for Skrillex as a collaborator". David Cobbald of The Line of Best Fit felt the inclusion of "Don't Go" makes the album "more of a pop record than Quest For Fire" and questioned "whether this record would've been better if it was released first" as it "adds a certain depth to its predecessor" despite "the albums still work[ing] as a pair" regardless. Ben Devlin of musicOMH found the album to be "shorter and considerably more patchy" than Quest for Fire, with "gargly autotune" from Chief Keef on "Bad for Me", the child vocals on "3am" becoming "tedious quickly" and the lyrics on "Don't Get Too Close" sounding "like one big in-joke", which "completely tanks the project's momentum", summarizing that the best songs amount "to a great EP".

Track listing

Notes
  signifies an additional producer
  signifies a vocal producer

Personnel
Musicians

 Skrillex – instruments, programming (all tracks), vocals (5, 10)
 Bobby Raps – vocals (1), instruments, programming (7)
 Nai Barghouti – additional vocals (1)
 PinkPantheress – instruments, programming, vocals (2)
 Danny L Harle – instruments, programming (2)
 Dylan Wiggins – instruments, programming (2)
 Trippie Redd – vocals (2)
 Theron Thoams – additional vocals (3)
 Beam – vocals (3)
 Dylan Wiggins – instruments, programming (4)
 Rex Kudo – instruments, programming (4, 11)
 Bladee – vocals (4, 5)
 Yung Lean – vocals (4)
 Kid Cudi – vocals (6)
 Lido – instruments, programming (7, 10)
 Chief Keef – vocals (7)
 Corbin – vocals (7)
 Dxnnyfxntm – instruments, programming (8)
 Anthony Green – vocals (8)
 Prentiss – vocals (8)
 Harv – instruments, guitar, programming (9)
 Carlton McDowell – guitar (9)
 Don Toliver – vocals (9)
 Justin Bieber – vocals (9)
 Bibi Bourelly – vocals (10, 12)
 Virtual Riot – programming (11)
 Peter Lee Johnson – synthesizer (11)
 Swae Lee – vocals (11)

Technical
 Skrillex – mixing (all tracks), mastering (1–8, 10–12), engineering (1–8, 10–12)
 Luca Pretolesi – mixing, mastering (2)
 Chris Lake – mixing (3)
 Tom Norris – mixing (4, 5, 8, 10, 12), mastering (5)
 Manny Marroquin – mixing (9)
 Mike Bozzi – mastering (9)
 Drew Gold – engineering
 William Sullivan – engineering (6)
 Kenny Harmon – engineering, vocal mixing (7)
 Derek "206derek" Anderson – engineering (9)
 Josh Gudwin – engineering (9)
 Lelievre Mickael _ Album Cover artwork

Charts

References

2023 albums
Skrillex albums
Albums produced by Skrillex
Atlantic Records albums
Owsla albums
Emo rap albums